The 1974 Kilkenny Senior Hurling Championship was the 80th staging of the Kilkenny Senior Hurling Championship since its establishment by the Kilkenny County Board.

On 20 October 1974, Fenians won the championship after a 0-10 to 0-06 defeat of Bennettsbridge in the final. It was their fourth championship title overall and their third title in succession.

Results

Semi-finals

Final

References

Kilkenny Senior Hurling Championship
Kilkenny Senior Hurling Championship